The 1893 Grand National was the 55th renewal of the Grand National horse race that took place at Aintree near Liverpool, England, on 24 March 1893.

Owner Charles Duff went on to field two more winners in 1912 and 1913, when he had become
Sir Charles Assheton-Smith.

Finishing Order

Non-finishers

References

 1893
Grand National
Grand National
19th century in Lancashire